Trifurcula etnensis is a moth of the family Nepticulidae. It was described by A. and Z. Laštuvka in 2005. It is known from Mount Etna, Sicily.

References

Nepticulidae
Endemic fauna of Italy
Moths described in 2005
Moths of Europe